The interarytenoid fold is a small ligament in the posterior larynx.

See also
 Arytenoid cartilage

Ligaments of the head and neck